The Governor of La Rioja is a citizen of La Rioja Province in Argentina holding the office of governor for the corresponding period. The governor is elected alongside a vice-governor. Currently the governor of La Rioja is Ricardo Quintela, since 11 December 2019.

Governors since 1983

See also
 Legislature of La Rioja

References

External links